In modern usage, an orgy is a sex party consisting of at least five members where guests freely engage in open and unrestrained sexual activity or group sex.

Swingers' parties do not always conform to this designation, because at many swinger parties the sexual partners may all know each other or at least have some commonality among economic class, educational attainment or other shared attributes. Some swingers contend that an orgy, as opposed to a sex party, requires some anonymity of sexual partners in complete sexual abandon. Other kinds of "sex party" may fare less well with this labeling.

Participation in an "orgy" is a common sexual fantasy, and group sex targeting such consumers is a subgenre in pornographic films. 

The term is also used metaphorically in expressions, such as an "orgy of colour" or an "orgy of destruction" to indicate excess, overabundance. The term "orgiastic" does not generally connote group sex and is closer to the classical roots and this metaphorical usage.

Ancient orgia

In ancient Greek religion, orgia (ὄργια, sing. ὄργιον, orgion) were ecstatic rites characteristic of the Greek and Hellenistic mystery religions. Unlike public religion, or the private religious practices of a household, the mysteries were open only to initiates, and were thus "secret". Some rites were held at night. Orgia were part of the Eleusinian Mysteries, the Dionysian Mysteries, and the cult of Cybele, which involved the castration of her priests in a frenzied trance. Because of their secret, nocturnal, and unscripted nature, the orgia were subject to prurient speculation and regarded with suspicion, particularly by the Romans, who attempted to suppress the Bacchanals in 186 BC. Orgia are popularly thought to have involved sex, but, while sexuality and fertility were cultic concerns, the primary goal of the orgia was to achieve an ecstatic union with the divine.

In films
Orgy scenes are featured in various films, including Caligula, Bachelor Party, Zoolander 2, Eyes Wide Shut, Sausage Party, and The Wolf of Wall Street.

See also
 Bacchanalia
 Gang bang
 Khlysts

References
Notes

Bibliography
 Adkins, Lesley and Adkins, Roy A. (1998). Handbook to Life in Ancient Greece. .
 Alexander, Timothy Jay (2007). Hellenismos Today. .
 Alexander, Timothy Jay (2007). A Beginner's Guide to Hellenismos. .
 Burnet, John (2005). Early Greek Philosophy. .
 Dillon, Matthew (2002). Girls and Women in Classical Greek Religion. .
 Maffesoli, Michel (1993). The Shadow of Dionysus: A Contribution to the Sociology of the Orgy. .
 Persson, Martin (1970). The Minoan-Mycenaean Religion and Its Survival in Greek Religion. .
 Wilson, Nigel Guy (2005). Encyclopedia of Ancient Greece. .

External links
 

Group sex